Draw the Line may refer to:

 Draw the Line (Aerosmith album), 1977
 "Draw the Line" (song), 1977
 Draw the Line (David Gray album) or the title song, 2009
 Draw the Line (Ghetto Mafia album) or the title song, 1994
 Draw the Line (TV series), a 2005 Philippine TV series

See also 
 Drawing the Line (disambiguation)
 Line in the Sand (disambiguation)